Coronavirus diseases are caused by viruses in the coronavirus subfamily, a group of related RNA viruses that cause diseases in mammals and birds. In humans and birds, the group of viruses cause respiratory tract infections that can range from mild to lethal. Mild illnesses in humans include some cases of the common cold (which is also caused by other viruses, predominantly rhinoviruses), while more lethal varieties can cause SARS, MERS and COVID-19. As of 2021, 45 species are registered as coronaviruses, whilst 11 diseases have been identified, as listed below.

Coronaviruses are known for their shape resembling a stellar corona, such as that of the Sun visible during a total solar eclipse; corona is derived from the Latin word , meaning 'garland, wreath, crown'. It was coined by Tony Waterson (professor of virology at St Thomas' Hospital) in a meeting with his colleagues June Almeida and David Tyrrell, the founding fathers of coronavirus studies, and was first used in a Nature article in 1968, with approval by the International Committee for the Nomenclature of Viruses three years later.

The first coronavirus disease was discovered in the late 1920s, however, the most recent common ancestor of coronaviruses is estimated to have existed as recently as 8000 BCE. For a long time, coronaviradae were of limited interest to the wider scientific community, although this changed after SARS. Human coronaviruses were discovered in the 1960s, through a variety of experiments in the United States and the United Kingdom. A common origin in human coronaviruses is bats.

List

See also 

 Coronaviridae
 Alphacoronavirus
 Betacoronavirus
 Gammacoronavirus
 Deltacoronavirus
 Novel coronavirus (nCoV)

References 

Respiratory syndrome
Syndromes affecting the respiratory system
Pneumonia
Zoonoses
Coronavirus-associated diseases